Seyyed Mohsen Shah Ebrahimi (in Persian: سید محسن شاه ابراهیمی) is an art director, costume designer and actor. Born in 1954, Iran. Studied art directing in the Faculty of Fine Arts in Florence, Italy (1980). He started his career with By the Ponds (1986, Y. Noasri), received the prize in FFF for The 'Night Nurse' (1987, M.-A. Najafi). As well as being a prominent art director, he has two films as an actor in his career.

Works

Production designer
 Mum's Guest ,2004
 In Amethyst Color ,2005
 Mokhtarnameh (TV series) ,2010
 Muhammad: The Messenger of God  ,2015
 Daughter ,2016
 Bomb: A Love Story ,2018
 Salman the Persian (TV series) ,2019

Actor
 Eye of the Hurricane , 1989
 Avinar (co)
 What Else Is New? (co), 1991
 The Snowman, 1994 (screened in 1997)
 Iran Is My Land
 Mummy 3, 1998 (Iranian made)
Traveler of Rey , 2000

External links
 

Iranian art directors
People from Khorramshahr
1954 births
Living people